We Are Next of Kin is a 2022 German coming-of-age psychological drama film directed by Hans-Christian Schmid, based on the autobiographical book of the same name by Johann Scheerer. The story is about the kidnapping of Jan Philipp Reemtsma, but from the point of view of his son Johann, then 13 years old. Following its premiere at the 2022 Hamburg Film Festival, it was released in German cinemas on 3 November 2022.

Cast 
Claude Heinrich: Johann Scheerer
Adina Vetter: Ann Kathrin Scheerer
Justus von Dohnányi: Johann Schwenn
Hans Löw: Christian Schneider
Yorck Dippe: Vera
Enno Trebs: Nickel
Fabian Hinrichs: Rainer Osthoff
Philipp Hauß: Jan Philipp Reemtsma
heresa Berlage: Claudia Brockmann
Knud Riepen: Michael Herrmann
Jan-Peter Kampwirth: Pastor Christian Arndt
Uwe Zerwer: Professor Clausen
Caspar Hoffman: Tobias
Oskar Lampen: Kai
Ivo Dahlmann: Daniel
Tim Porath: Jürgen Jaitner

Reception 
Daniel Kothenschulte praised the film in the Frankfurter Rundschau as "a rare gem of German cinema". It is a "psychological drama of seductive power". In his film review in the Frankfurter Allgemeine Zeitung, Andreas Kilb acknowledged Schmid's ability to have a clear stance and an unshakable visual instinct.

Martina Knoben wrote in the Süddeutsche Zeitung that the film is “[really] […] completely unsentimental”, “almost brutally sober. Entertainment cinema likes to find the silver lining in tragedies, but Hans-Christian Schmid denies any meaning to the perpetrators and the crime." In Deutschlandfunk Kultur, Jörg Taszman called the production a "strong piece of cinema with excellent actors ". The director manages to "maintain the suspense, capturing the endless and grueling wait in a subtle way".

In his review in Screen Daily, Tim Gierson said it is "a slow-burn drama (...) Schmid subtly illustrates how this gruelling odyssey has forever changed a family".

References

External links 
 
 
 Rotten Tomatoes

2020s German films
2020s German-language films
2020s drama films
German coming-of-age drama films
2020s coming-of-age drama films
Films directed by Hans-Christian Schmid